Quentin Kūhiō Kawānanakoa (born September 28, 1961) is an American politician and member of the House of Kawānanakoa. Kawānanakoa is an organizer of the Republican Party of Hawaii. He is also an heir to the James Campbell estate.

Early years
Kawānanakoa was born September 28, 1961. He was the second son of his father Edward A. Kawānanakoa and his mother Carolyn Willison Kawānanakoa. He was raised in Honolulu where he graduated from Punahou School. Kawānanakoa went on to study at the University of Southern California. He returned to Oahu and graduated from the William S. Richardson School of Law. Upon obtaining his Juris Doctor degree, he served in private practice at the law firm Case, Bigelow & Lombardi until 2000. He was a member of the inaugural 1997 class of the Pacific Century Fellows.

Political life
In 1994, Kawānanakoa followed in his ancestors' footsteps and got involved in politics. Like his great-grandmother Abigail Campbell Kawānanakoa and great uncle Prince Jonah Kūhiō Kalanianaole, Kawānanakoa joined the Republican Party of Hawaii for its pro-business stance. He ran and won an election for the Hawai`i State House of Representatives, an office he served through 1998. He rose through the ranks of party leadership becoming minority floor leader. During an attempt to mount a challenge for the Congressional seat held by Neil Abercrombie, Kawānanakoa abruptly retired from active political life after being hospitalized.

In April 2006, after eight years out of the public eye, Kawānanakoa announced his run for the Congressional seat held by Ed Case, who chose not to run for U.S. Senate. He declared his candidacy on April 23, 2006.  In the primary elections held on September 24, 2006, Kawānanakoa was defeated by State Senator Robert Hogue. The final vote total was Hogue: 8,393 votes (45.6%) vs. Kawānanakoa: 8,194 votes (44.5%). Senator Hogue went on to lose to Mazie Hirono.

In 2008, Kawānanakoa unsuccessfully ran for the Hawaii State House of Representatives. His opponent in the November 4, 2008, election was Democrat Chris Kalani Lee. Lee won with 5,885 votes to Kawānanakoa's 3,374 votes.

Family
In September 1995, Kawānanakoa married Elizabeth Broun, a native of Jamaica. Their first child, Kincaid Kawānanakoa, was born in June 1997. In December 1999, their second child, Riley, was born. Quentin is the great-grandson of Prince David Kawānanakoa and Princess Abigail Campbell Kawānanakoa through his paternal grandmother Abigail Kapiolani Kawānanakoa.

Tree

References

External links

1961 births
Living people
Politicians from Honolulu
People from Monterey, California
House of Kawānanakoa
Republican Party members of the Hawaii House of Representatives
Punahou School alumni
University of Southern California alumni
William S. Richardson School of Law alumni
Hawaii lawyers
Pretenders to the Hawaiian throne
Princes of Hawaii
American people of Scotch-Irish descent
American people of English descent
American people of Native Hawaiian descent
Native Hawaiian people
Asian conservatism in the United States